Senegalia (from Senegal and Acacia senegal (L.) Willd.) is a genus of flowering plants in the family Fabaceae. It belongs to the Mimosoid clade. Until 2005, its species were considered members of Acacia.
The genus was considered polyphyletic and required further division,  with the genera Parasenegalia and Pseudosenegalia accepted soon after.

Senegalia can be distinguished from other acacias by its spicate inflorescences and non-spinescent stipules.  
Plants in the genus are native to the tropical and subtropical areas of the world, occurring on the Australian, Asian, African and South and North American continents, as well as in Wallacea.

Species list
Senegalia comprises the following 222 species, as of February 2021:

Senegalia adenocalyx 
Senegalia albizioides  — climbing wattle
Senegalia alemquerensis 
Senegalia alexae 
Senegalia altiscandens 
Senegalia amazonica 
Senegalia andamanica 
Senegalia angustifolia 
Senegalia anisophylla 
Senegalia ankokib 
Senegalia aristeguietana 
Senegalia asak 
Senegalia ataxacantha  — flame acacia
Senegalia atlantica 
Senegalia bahiensis 
Senegalia baronii 
Senegalia berlandieri 
Senegalia bonariensis 
Senegalia borneensis  — cat's claw acacia
Senegalia brevispica 
Senegalia burkei  — Black monkey thorn
Senegalia caesia 
Senegalia caffra 
Senegalia caraniana 
Senegalia catechu  — Cutch tree
Senegalia catharinensis 
Senegalia cearensis 
Senegalia chariessa 
Senegalia cheilanthifolia 
Senegalia chundra 
Senegalia circummarginata 
Senegalia clandestina 
Senegalia comosa 
Senegalia condyloclada 
Senegalia crassifolia  — Anacacho orchid tree
Senegalia croatii 
Senegalia cupuliformis 
Senegalia delavayi 
Senegalia densispina 
Senegalia diadenia 
Senegalia donaldi 
Senegalia donnaiensis 
Senegalia duartei 
Senegalia dudgeonii 
Senegalia ebingeri 
Senegalia emilioana 
Senegalia × emoryana 
Senegalia eriocarpa  — Woolly-podded acacia
Senegalia erubescens 
Senegalia erythrocalyx 
Senegalia etilis 
Senegalia ferruginea 
Senegalia fiebrigii 
Senegalia flagellaris 
Senegalia fleckii 
Senegalia fumosa 
Senegalia gageana 
Senegalia galpinii 
Senegalia garrettii 
Senegalia gaumeri 
Senegalia giganticarpa 
Senegalia gilliesii 
Senegalia globosa 
Senegalia goetzei 
Senegalia gourmaensis 
Senegalia grandistipula 
Senegalia greggii  — catclaw, cat's-claw, catclaw acacia, garra del diablo, Gregg catclaw, long-flower catclaw, paradise flower, Texas catclaw, Texas mimosa, wait-a-bit
Senegalia guangdongensis 
Senegalia guarensis 
Senegalia hainanensis 
Senegalia hamulosa 
Senegalia harleyi 
Senegalia hatschbachii 
Senegalia hayesii 
Senegalia hecatophylla 
Senegalia hereroensis  — Mountain thorn
Senegalia hildebrandtii 
Senegalia hoehnei 
Senegalia hohenackeri 
Senegalia huberi 
Senegalia insuavis 
Senegalia interior  — Interior acacia
Senegalia intsia 
Senegalia irwinii 
Senegalia kallunkiae 
Senegalia kamerunensis 
Senegalia kekapur 
Senegalia kelloggiana 
Senegalia kerrii 
Senegalia klugii 
Senegalia kostermansii 
Senegalia kraussiana 
Senegalia kuhlmannii 
Senegalia kunmingensis 
Senegalia lacerans 
Senegalia laeta 
Senegalia langsdorffii 
Senegalia lankaensis 
Senegalia lasiophylla 
Senegalia latifoliola 
Senegalia latistipulata 
Senegalia lenticularis 
Senegalia lewisii 
Senegalia limae 
Senegalia loetteri 
Senegalia loretensis 
Senegalia lowei 
Senegalia lozanoi 
Senegalia lujae 
Senegalia macbridei 
Senegalia macilenta  — Thin acacia
Senegalia macrocephala 
Senegalia macrostachya 
Senegalia magnibracteosa 
Senegalia mahrana 
Senegalia manubensis 
Senegalia martii 
Senegalia martiusiana 
Senegalia maschalocephala 
Senegalia mattogrossensis 
Senegalia meeboldii 
Senegalia megaladena 
Senegalia mellifera 
Senegalia menabeensis 
Senegalia meridionalis 
Senegalia merrillii  — Merrill's wattle
Senegalia micrantha 
Senegalia mikanii 
Senegalia mirandae 
Senegalia modesta 
Senegalia moggii 
Senegalia monacantha 
Senegalia montigena 
Senegalia montis-salinarum 
Senegalia montis-usti  — Brandberg acacia
Senegalia nigrescens 
Senegalia nitidifolia 
Senegalia noblickii 
Senegalia obliqua 
Senegalia occidentalis  — Western acacia, Tree catclaw
Senegalia ochracea 
Senegalia ogadensis 
Senegalia olivensana 
Senegalia orientalis 
Senegalia paganuccii 
Senegalia painteri 
Senegalia palawanensis 
Senegalia paniculata 
Senegalia paraensis 
Senegalia parviceps 
Senegalia pedicellata 
Senegalia peninsularis  — Peninsular acacia
Senegalia pennata  — Climbing wattle
Senegalia pentagona 
Senegalia persiciflora 
Senegalia pervillei 
Senegalia petrensis 
Senegalia phillippei 
Senegalia piauhiensis 
Senegalia picachensis  — Mount Picachos acacia
Senegalia piptadenioides 
Senegalia pluricapitata 
Senegalia pluriglandulosa 
Senegalia polhillii 
Senegalia polyacantha  — Catechu tree
Senegalia polyphylla  — Manyleaf acacia
Senegalia praecox 
Senegalia prominens 
Senegalia pruinescens 
Senegalia pseudointsia 
Senegalia pseudonigrescens 
Senegalia pteridifolia 
Senegalia purpusii 
Senegalia quadriglandulosa 
Senegalia rafinesqueana 
Senegalia recurva 
Senegalia reniformis 
Senegalia rhytidocarpa 
Senegalia ricoae 
Senegalia riparia  — Catch and keep, Riparian acacia
Senegalia robynsiana 
Senegalia roemeriana  — Catclaw, Roemer acacia, Roemer catclaw, Round-flower catclaw
Senegalia rostrata 
Senegalia rovumae 
Senegalia rugata 
Senegalia sakalava 
Senegalia saltilloensis 
Senegalia schlechteri 
Senegalia schweinfurthii 
Senegalia seigleri 
Senegalia senegal 
Senegalia serra 
Senegalia somalensis 
Senegalia sororia 
Senegalia stenocarpa 
Senegalia stipitata 
Senegalia subangulata 
Senegalia subsessilis 
Senegalia sulitii 
Senegalia tamarindifolia  — Tamarind-leaf acacia
Senegalia tanganyikensis 
Senegalia tanjorensis 
Senegalia tawitawiensis 
Senegalia taylorii 
Senegalia teniana 
Senegalia tenuifolia 
Senegalia tephrodermis 
Senegalia thailandica 
Senegalia thomasii 
Senegalia tonkinensis 
Senegalia torta 
Senegalia trijuga 
Senegalia tucumanensis 
Senegalia × turneri 
Senegalia velutina 
Senegalia venosa 
Senegalia verheijenii 
Senegalia vietnamensis 
Senegalia weberbaueri 
Senegalia welwitschii 
Senegalia westiana 
Senegalia wrightii  — catclaw, long-flower catclaw, Texas catclaw, Wright acacia, Wright's acacia, Wright catclaw, Wright catclaw acacia
Senegalia yunnanensis 
Senegalia × zamudioi 
Senegalia zizyphispina

Reassigned taxa
Senegalia grandisiliqua , synonym of Senegalia tenuifolia var. tenuifolia

See also
 Acacia
 Acaciella
 Mariosousa
 Parasenegalia
 Pseudosenegalia
 Vachellia

References

 
Fabaceae genera